Risto Hurme (born 16 May 1950) is a Finnish modern pentathlete and fencer. He won a bronze medal in the team modern pentathlon event at the 1972 Summer Olympics.

References

External links
 

1950 births
Living people
Finnish male épée fencers
Olympic fencers of Finland
Olympic modern pentathletes of Finland
Finnish male modern pentathletes
Fencers at the 1972 Summer Olympics
Fencers at the 1976 Summer Olympics
Modern pentathletes at the 1972 Summer Olympics
Modern pentathletes at the 1976 Summer Olympics
Olympic bronze medalists for Finland
Olympic medalists in modern pentathlon
Sportspeople from Turku
Medalists at the 1972 Summer Olympics
20th-century Finnish people
21st-century Finnish people